My Religion is the eighth studio album by the Norwegian hard rock band TNT, released on 8 March 2004. It marked a return to the glam metal direction that ended with Realized Fantasies. It was said to be a "breath of fresh air" by most fans and received excellent reviews worldwide when it was released. It is regarded by a large part of TNT's fanbase to be their best album ever, including more known albums such as Tell No Tales and Intuition. Sid Ringsby joined the band to finish the rest of the touring for My Religion and to record the follow-up album, All The Way To The Sun.

This was the final TNT album on which Morty Black played the bass guitar. He left in late 2004 to join Åge Aleksandersen's band.

Track listing

 The guitar effect in "She Needs Me" was created using the overdrive effect, and punching a hole in the speaker's powertube.
 "She Needs Me" is Tony Harnell's favorite song on My Religion.

Personnel

Band 
Tony Harnell – vocals
Ronni Le Tekrø – guitars
Morty Black – bass guitar
Diesel Dahl – drums, percussion

Additional personnel
Dag Stokke – keyboards
Amy Anderson – background vocals, recorder

Album credits
 Produced by Tony Harnell and Ronni Le Tekrø

Sources
http://www.ronniletekro.com/discography-album-23.html

2004 albums
TNT (Norwegian band) albums